List of the published work of Calvin Trillin, American writer.

Non-fiction
 
 
 
 
 
 Third Helpings (1983)
 Killings (1984)
 With All Disrespect (1985)
 If You Can’t Say Something Nice (1987)
 Travels with Alice (1989)
 Enough’s Enough (and Other Rules of Life) (1990)
 American Stories (1991)
 Remembering Denny (1993)
 Too Soon to Tell (1995)
 Messages From My Father (1996)
 Family Man (1998)
 Feeding a Yen (2003)
 About Alice (2006)
 "Quite Enough of Calvin Trillin" (2011) 
 Jackson, 1964: And Other Dispatches from Fifty Years of Reporting on Race in America (2016)

Novels
 Runestruck (novel, 1977)
 Floater (novel, 1980)
 Tepper Isn’t Going Out (novel, 2001)

Short fiction
 Barnett Frummer is an Unbloomed Flower (short stories, 1969)

Poetry
 Deadline Poet: My Life as a Doggerelist (comic verse with commentary, 1994)
 Obliviously on He Sails: The Bush Administration in Rhyme (comic verse with commentary, 2004)
 A Heckuva Job: More of the Bush Administration in Rhyme (comic verse with commentary, 2006)
 Deciding The Next Decider: The 2008 Presidential Race in Rhyme (comic verse with commentary, 2008)
 Dogfight: The 2012 Presidential Campaign in Verse (comic verse with commentary, 2012) Random House

Essays, reporting and other contributions

Notes

Bibliographies by writer
Bibliographies of American writers